Ainge (1981) is an out of print non-fiction book by author Orson Scott Card. It is a biography of star basketball player Danny Ainge. Two thousand copies were printed, distributed only in Provo, Utah, United States.

See also
List of works by Orson Scott Card
Orson Scott Card

External links
 The official Orson Scott Card website

1981 non-fiction books
Books by Orson Scott Card
Signature Books books